Jan III Sobieski is a Polish brand of cigarettes, currently owned and manufactured by British American Tobacco. The brand is named after the 17th-century Polish King Jan III Sobieski.

History
The brand was introduced in March 1994. When BAT began the manufacturing process, they became one of the key products of the foreign owner. The brand has become a phenomenon in the world, because in a few months it gained a very large market share, leading to a rapid rise in Polish statistics concerning the manufacture of cigarettes. In 2000, the cigarettes were some of the most popular brands of tobacco products in Poland. In the class King and the product was the undisputed leader. Jan III Sobieski had 8% of the Polish cigarette market.

Trade mark registration
In June 1995 BAT has submitted an application for a registration of the trade mark "Jan III Sobieski", strictly specifying the set of words, graphics, as well as the font and colors that had to be trademarked. However, acquiring the trademark was not easy, because the Polish Patent Office ran relatively hard politics and rebellious record characters using popular names. In the case of King Jan III Sobieski, it was considered that its use as a brand of tobacco "would undermine the moral standards, respect for national traditions of the people of the late King and that was a depreciation values and authority figures". Only after the revision of the emergency the President UP the name King John III had been registered by the Office. All three versions are registered by the Polish Patent Office and protected from June 1995 onwards, contain the word "Jan III Sobieski".

Legal controversy
In the mid 90s. British American Tobacco launched the new brand of Polish cigarettes, which successfully went on the Polish market. However, four years after the founding of the brand of cigarettes to shops, there was a vodka brand bearing the same name, in which the logo on the label was confusingly similar to what was on the packaging of tobacco products of BAT. Belonging to the French group Belvedere S.A. make strong wines repeated success with the reputation earned by cigarettes. At the end of the 90s, Belvedere Distribution also introduced mineral water with the same name, at the same time, starting with the ad campaign of the new product. However, the lead role in the conflict between the leaders on the market of tobacco and vodka was at play. For company Belvedere in favour of works committees of Solidarność working in producing the drink "Jan III Sobieski" Sieradz Polmosie and Warsaw Koneserze. BAT in turn supported the Association of Manufacturers of branded products "Pro", for building, promotion and protection of the trade mark. The Polish Patent Office concluded, however, that using the same name for the two industries can cause confusion, that the brand "Jan III Sobieski" belongs to one owner, by what authority did not accept an instance of the vodka producer to enter in the register the name of the for the alcoholic product.

See also

 Tobacco smoking

References

1994 establishments in Poland
British American Tobacco brands